Per Stig Møller (informal: Per Stig; born 27 August 1942 in Frederiksberg) is a Danish politician. He was a member of the Folketing (Danish national parliament) for the Conservative People's Party from 1984 until 2015, and was Minister for the Environment from 18 December 1990 to 24 January 1993 as part of the Cabinet of Poul Schlüter IV and Foreign Minister from 27 November 2001 to 23 February 2010 as part of the Cabinet of Anders Fogh Rasmussen I, II and III, and the first Cabinet of Lars Løkke Rasmussen. From 23 February 2010 to 3 October 2011 he was Minister for Culture.

Per Stig Møller is the son of the former Finance Minister Poul Møller and journalist Lis Møller, who were both Members of Parliament.

Education 
Per Stig Møller completed his master's degree in comparative literature at the University of Copenhagen in 1967, and was awarded a dr.phil. (higher doctorate) in 1973 for his thesis Malte-Bruns litterære kritik og dens plads i transformationsprocessen mellem klassicisme og romantik i fransk litteraturhistorie 1800-1826 (Eng.: Literary criticism of Malte-Brun and its position in the transformation process between classicism and romanticism in French history of literature 1800-1826).

Non-political career
1973 - 1974: Editor of culture in Danmarks Radio.
1974 - 1976: Lecturer at the University of Paris.
1974, 1976 - 1979: Vice president (souschef) at the department of culture and society at Danmarks Radio.
1979 - 1984: Working with the program manager at Danmarks Radio.
1985 - 1986: Vice president of Radiorådet, the leading organ of Danmarks Radio which is appointed by Folketinget.
1986 - 1987: President of Radiorådet.
1984 - 2001: Commentator at the newspaper Berlingske Tidende.

Political career
1983 - 1989: President of Folkeligt Oplysningsforbund.
1984 – 2015: Member of Folketinget for the Conservative People's Party.
1985 - 1998: Member of hovedbestyrelsen, the leadership of the Conservative People's Party.
1987 - 2001: Member of the Council of Europe.
1990 - 1993: Minister for the Environment in the Cabinet of Poul Schlüter IV.
1994 - 2001: Member of Udenrigspolitisk Nævn, the committee for foreign policy.
1994 - 1996: President of Sikkerhedspolitisk Udvalg, the committee of security.
1997 - 1998: Leader of the Conservative People's Party, succeeding Hans Engell. He resigned after a poor result in the election in 1998.
1998 - 2001: Foreign policy spokesman for the Conservative People's Party.
2001 - 2010: Foreign Minister of Denmark
2010–2011: Culture Minister of Denmark
2011–2011: Minister for Ecclesiastical Affairs of Denmark

Bibliography
Synspunkter i konservatismen (anthology) (1968)
Antikleksikon (with Preben Hasselbalch and Jens Winther) (1970)
La Critique dramatique et littéraire de Malte-Brun (1971)
Utopi og virkelighed (with Søren Krarup and Ebbe Reich) (1973)
Malte-Bruns litterære kritik og dens plads i transformationsprocessen mellem klassicisme og romantik i fransk litteraturhistorie 1800-1826 (Doctor of Philosophy|Ph. D. thesis)  (1973)
Léopold Sédar Senghor: Mod en ny civilisation (commentary) (1973)
Tøger Reenberg: Ars Poetica. Digte mellem to tider (commentary) (1973)
Erotismen (1973) 
København-Paris t/r (1973) 
Tværsnit 1790 (anthology) (1974) 
På Sporet af det forsvundne Menneske (1976) 
Forfatternes Danmarkshistorie (editor) (1977) 
Livet i Gøgereden (1978) 
Fra Tid til Anden (1979) 
Forfatternes kulturhistorie (editor) (1979) 
Tro, Håb og Fællesskab (1980) 
Forfatternes forfatterhistorie (editor) (1980) 
Midt i Redeligheden (1981) 
Orwells Håb og Frygt (1983) 
Nat uden Daggry (1985) 
Mulighedernes Samfund (with Bertel Haarder and Tom Høyem) (1985) 
Stemmer fra Øst (1987) 
Historien om Estland, Letland og Litauen (1990) 
Kurs mod Katastrofer? (1993) 
Miljøproblemer (1995) 
Den naturlige Orden - Tolv år der flyttede Verden (1996) 
Spor. Udvalgte Skrifter om det åbne Samfund og dets Værdier (1997) 
Magt og Afmagt (1999) 
Munk (2000) 
Mere Munk (2003) 
Samtale fremme forståelsen (2010) 
Kaj Munk, digter, præst og urostifter (2014) 
Aldrig skal Danmark dø (2015)

References

 

1942 births
Living people
Foreign ministers of Denmark
Conservative People's Party (Denmark) politicians
Radio in Denmark
People from Frederiksberg
University of Copenhagen alumni
Academic staff of the University of Paris
Members of the Folketing 1984–1987
Members of the Folketing 1987–1988
Members of the Folketing 1988–1990
Members of the Folketing 1990–1994
Members of the Folketing 1994–1998
Members of the Folketing 1998–2001
Members of the Folketing 2001–2005
Members of the Folketing 2005–2007
Members of the Folketing 2007–2011
Members of the Folketing 2011–2015
Danish Ministers for the Environment
Danish Ministers for Ecclesiastical Affairs
Recipients of the Order of the Cross of Terra Mariana, 1st Class
Recipients of Nersornaat
Grand Crosses 1st class of the Order of Merit of the Federal Republic of Germany
Leaders of the Conservative People's Party (Denmark)